The 2020–21 Second Men's League of Serbia is the 15th season of the Second Basketball League of Serbia, the 2nd-tier men's professional basketball league in Serbia.

The season is the first to be played after the previous season was abandoned due to the COVID-19 pandemic in Serbia. The Basketball Federation of Serbia ruled that the 11 teams from the previous season will stay in the league and the highest-placed clubs from four divisions of the First Regional League will be promoted, while the three highest-placed clubs from the previous season will be promoted to the First League.

Teams
A total of 16 teams participated in the 2020–21 Second Men's League of Serbia, divided into two geographical groups with 8 clubs.

Promotion and relegation 
Teams promoted to the First League (1st-tier)
 Radnički Kragujevac
 Sloga
 Pirot
Teams relegated from the First League (1st-tier)
None
Teams promoted from the First Regional League (3rd-tier)
Vrbas
Slodes
Klik
Bor RTB
Napredak Junior
Teams relegated to the First Regional League (3rd-tier)
None
Other actions
In August 2020, Zemun withdraw from the 2020–21 season and got relegated to the First Regional League while Spartak failed to fulfill requirements for the Second League and got relegated to the 4th-tier Second Regional League. To fulfill the remaining spots, the Basketball Federation of Serbia gave two wildcards to Borac Zemun and Star.

Venues and locations

Head coaches

Regular season

Group North

Group South

Post-season

Playoff

Playout

See also
 2020–21 Basketball League of Serbia
 2020–21 Basketball Cup of Serbia

References

External links
 Official website of Second Basketball League
 League Standings at eurobasket.com
 League Standings at srbijasport.net

Second Basketball League of Serbia
Serbia
Basketball